Pazardzhik Clock Tower is a clock tower located in Pazardzhik, Bulgaria.

History

From the founding to the demolition 
The tower was built in the 18th century in Tatar Pazardzhik and was demolished in 1928 due to the serious Chirpan–Plovdiv earthquakes. Almost a hundred years later in 2010 the local community rebuilt it with common forces. The tower stands on the Unification Square.

The first tower was established in 1741 in Tatar Pazardzhik, which was located in the Ottoman Empire. The clock tower in Pazardzhik is very old and was originally built in 1741. At the time exact time was something exotic and the Ottoman idea of time was a very loose concept. The Turks were not famous for their accuracy, but Bulgarian craftsmen and traders needed more accurate measurement of time. So the tower was erected right in the center of the town, just next to the Ottoman governor's quarters, the marketplace and the workshops. It was the town clock. It is supposed to have had the shape of a prism and its base was hexagonal or twelve-sided, placed on a pedestal shaped like a parallelepiped. The clock mechanism was placed in a niche that was located in the pyramid above the pedestal. On the tower there was an inscription which read as follows: 'The Honorable Ibrahim aga Hairulov honored us with the making of this clock, which strikes the hour by hour and makes the city merry'. The year of the construction according to the Turkish calendar - 1154. In 1928 the tower was demolished and only a few pieces of stone and the pedestal remained.

The only surviving photograph of the tower was taken the year before it was demolished. It was taken by Professor Ivan Batakliev. There is also a painting of it by the artist Stoyan Vasliev. Until 1980 the bell from the tower was kept in the local school "Georgi Bregov", but then it disappeared and has not been found until today.

Renovation 
The Rotary Club of Pazardzhik undertook the difficult task of restoring the old clock tower. Hristo Gerasimov came up with the idea and the project. The aim of the new project is to make the tower as close as possible to the appearance of the old one. The project and the preparation of all the necessary permits took seven years. In May 2004, the construction of the new clock tower of the town began in Pazardzhik. A metal capsule was bricked into its walls with a message for future generations and a short history. A donation campaign was made to raise the necessary funds. A year after the start of the construction work in May 2010, which was the day of Pazardzhik, the new clock tower was officially opened.

Today, it is built on the old stone foundations, which have been rebuilt. A pyramid has been built on top of them, making the transition to an eight-walled prism. In the niche where the old clock once stood, sculptures of the city's patron saints, St. Constantine and St. Helena, are now placed. It has a metal ladder and windows that illuminate it with natural light. At the top of the tower there are four Swiss clocks and a lightning rod.

References 

Pazardzhik
Clock towers
Clock towers in Bulgaria
Structures in Pazardzhik
Buildings and structures in Pazardzhik Province